Armor Alley is a computer wargame for DOS and Mac OS published by Three-Sixty Pacific in 1991. It is modelled on the Apple II game Rescue Raiders. Player can compete against the computer or other humans via LAN. The game supports cooperative multiplayer of up to two players per side. The player controls a helicopter armed with a limited number of munitions, such as missiles, bombs, machine guns, and napalm. As the player requisitions computer-controlled tanks, infantry, engineers. Mobile missile platforms, and vans round out available firepower.

Gameplay 

The objective is to destroy an opposing base at the opposite end of the play area. Various units are deployed for this purpose, which can be assisted by the player's helicopter. The enemy has the same arsenal as the player, so tactics and convoy composition are vital. Only the van, which contains electronic warfare equipment, can achieve victory by coming into contact with the enemy base. Its armor is quite weak, so these units must be protected at all times.

The two-dimensional battlefield is a long strip of ground, with the player's base on the left end and the enemy's base on the right.  Every map has these two bases, but each map has a different pattern of fixed terrain features.  The game ends when one of these two bases is captured.

The player's view is always focused on the central unit, the helicopter.  The helicopter carries 2 guided missiles, 10 bombs and has a machine gun with 64 rounds of ammunition (at higher levels the machine gun is replaced by 6 unguided missiles).  The helicopter's fuel is limited, so each player has to return to base before there is insufficient fuel left for the trip back.  The helicopter is very vulnerable to enemy fire and so relies on its agility and the player's control to survive on the battlefield.

Budget 

War funds slowly trickle into a spending account that allows purchase of units. Each unit has an associated cost. A helicopter costs 20, tanks 4, mobile missile launchers 3, vans 2, infantry and engineers 5. The player must spend carefully to ensure the purchase of equipment as needed. The farther the helicopter is from its landing pad, the higher the rate of funding. The more assets the player has on the ground at the end of a battle the more funds the player has to start the next battle.

All units must be purchased by the player, but once bought, they blindly advance to the right towards the enemy base.  Extra lives may be purchased by buying more helicopters.

Reception 
The game was reviewed in 1991 in Dragon #166 by Hartley, Patricia, and Kirk Lesser in "The Role of Computers" column. The reviewers gave the game 5 out of 5 stars. 1992 and 1994 Computer Gaming World surveys of wargames with modern settings gave the game one and a half stars out of five, describing it as "a short entertaining diversion, but little of serious import".

Remake
The game has been remade as a browser based game by Scott Schiller: http://www.schillmania.com/armor-alley/

Reviews
Games-X (Aug, 1991)
PC Joker (Nov, 1991)
ASM (Aktueller Software Markt) (Nov, 1991)

References

External links 
 

1991 video games
DOS games
Computer wargames
Helicopter video games
Horizontally scrolling shooters
Classic Mac OS games
Multiplayer and single-player video games
Video games developed in the United States